Folarin is the eighth mixtape by American rapper Wale, it was released on December 24, 2012. The mixtape features guest appearances from Rick Ross, 2 Chainz, Tiara Thomas, Scarface, Nipsey Hussle, French Montana, Chinx Drugz, Jhené Aiko, Travis Porter, Trinidad James, Hit-Boy, and Chrisette Michele among others.

Background 
The mixtape was announced on November 14, 2012. On November 14, 2012, the first song was released in promotion of the mixtape titled "Freedom of Speech". On December 13, 2012, the song "Back 2 Ballin'" featuring French Montana was released. On December 17, 2012, the second song was released in promotion of the mixtape titled "Too Much Talk". On December 20, 2012, the third song was released in promotion of the mixtape titled "The Blessings". On January 17, 2013, the music video was released for "Never Never". On February 17, 2013, the music video was released for "Let a Nigga Know" featuring Chinx Drugz and Fatz. On February 21, 2013, the music video was released for "Street Runner". On March 20, 2013, the music video was released for "The Show" featuring Rick Ross and Aaron Wess. On March 20, 2013, the music video was released for "Bad" featuring Tiara Thomas. "Bad" would also go on to be released as a single and has so far peaked at #36 on the Billboard Hot 100, making it Thomas' first Hot 100 entry, and one of Wale's most successful singles of his career. On April 23, 2013, the music video was released for "The One Eyed Kitten Song" featuring Travis Porter.

Critical reception

Folarin was met with generally positive reviews from music critics. Jesse Fairfax of HipHopDX said "In Wale's quest to bridge the gap between progressive Hip Hop and the lowest common denominator, his ongoing identity crisis risks confusing the large audience he caters to. With Folarin aiming to be all things to all people, its primary drawback is the inconsistency that accompanies this sort of branding. Though disappointing in some regards, Folarin manages to win with intense wordplay during its more inspired moments." Calvin Stovall of BET gave the mixtape three out of five stars, saying "On Folarin, Wale bounces through the mainstream rap universe, sampling the talents of his peers and giving fans the occasional flashes from his past needed to keep getting minutes from Coach Rozay. By underground and mainstream standards, he "made it." Folarin is not a definite swerve in either direction, but it certainly justifies one more strong push from the Maybach Music Group mothership. His helter skelter flow and intricate rhyme patterns are a return to his essence that will satisfy fans of his early mixtapes."

Track listing

References

2012 mixtape albums
Wale (rapper) albums
Albums produced by Diplo
Albums produced by Jake One
Albums produced by Nottz
Albums produced by Key Wane
Albums produced by Cardo
Albums produced by Willie B